The 2016 São Tomé (Island or Regional) Second Division was a third their competition that took place that season.  The club had 10 clubs, the competition began on 21 May and finished on 13 November. Geographically almost all clubs but Água Izé were from the north. FC Neves won the title and participated into the Premier Division in the following season, alongside second placed UDESCAI. A total of 90 matches were played and 291 goals were scored, higher than last season.

On the opposites, both Marítimo Micoló and Juba Diogo Simão were relegated into the Third Division in the following season as they were the last placed clubs. Juba Diogo Simão withdrew in the following season and will return for the 2018 Third Division. UDESCAI will return into the Second Division for 2018 as they were the last two placed clubs of the upper regional division.

Next season, 6 de Setembro and Ribeira Peixe were promoted into the Second Division as they were the top Third Division clubs of the season.

Overview
Sporting São Tomé scored the most goals numbering 49, second was FC Neves with 46 and third was UDESCAI with 36, and fourth was Amador with 31  Marítimo Micoló scored the least with only eight goals. On the opposites, Juba Diogo Simão conceded the most with 54, second was Boavista Uba Budo with 46 and third was sixth placed Palmar with 33.

Teams

The second division featured 10 clubs.

Division table

References

Football competitions in São Tomé and Príncipe
Sao Tome
Sao Tome Second Division